Cebu Eastern College is a Chinese Filipino school at the corner of Dimasalang and Leon Kilat in Cebu City, Philippines. The campus offers kindergarten, elementary, high school and college classes. Their other campus is at D. Jakosalem which offers classes up to the elementary level. CEC offers Chinese classes as well as English and Filipino subjects.

Sports
The school participates in the Cebu Schools Athletic Foundation, Inc. (CESAFI). They have been led by multiple CESAFI stars such as Nikee Montalvo, among many others. They won the Happee Online Sinulog Basketball Cup, defeating Hapee Online with a whopping final score of 195–192, led by their leading wingman Montalvo with 30 points in double overtime.

In the CESAFI 2010 season, CEC won the coveted championship crown, as the Dragons swept the SHS-Ateneo De Cebu Magis Eagles, 3–0, in a best-of-five series for the crown.

Other notable stars include basketball cagers Fabian, BJ Zosa, Mark Olayon, and Roy Villarias, who were among the selected players recruited by the UE Red Warriors to play in the UAAP.

External links

Chinese-language schools in the Philippines
Universities and colleges in Cebu City
Schools in Cebu City
Elementary schools in the Philippines
High schools in Cebu